Dong Jingwei (born November 18, 1963) is a Chinese politician who has served as vice minister of the Chinese Ministry of State Security (MSS) since 2018. Prior to that he served as the agency's chief of counterintelligence. In June 2021, limited reports surfaced alleging Dong’s defection to the United States with information on the origins of COVID-19.

Early life and career

Personal life 
Dong is a native of Zhao County, Hebei province. Educated in China, his postgraduate studies include a Masters of Science. He has a daughter, Dong Yang.

Intelligence career 
Dong's career in national security began with more than a decade of service as director of the Hebei provincial State Security Department (SSD), a regional unit of the Ministry of State Security. He led the department from February 2006 to March 30, 2017. During that time he was active in communist party politics, and involved in several regional committees and conferences. In 2007, he was appointed to the 7th Hebei Provincial Committee of the Chinese Communist Party (CCP). In 2010, reports surfaced from Paris-based Intelligence Online that Dong had carried out orders from superiors in Beijing to arrest four Japanese employees of the Fujita Corporation who "were filming in a forbidden military zone", a move the publication described as a power play by senior officials within the MSS against then-President and General Secretary Hu Jintao. His loyalty to superiors, age and regional background won him favor with senior party officials under Hu's successor, Xi Jinping, with Dong soon becoming a part of the Xi Jinping faction, the dominant political faction in the communist party. By 2018, Intelligence Online reported that Dong was close to Xi, observing that “he previously headed the Guo'anbu in the region of Hebei, a province which has produced many of Xi's securocrats." 

On April 1st, 2017, Dong was promoted from regional intelligence operations to a national posting in Beijing, appointed director of the Political Department of the MSS (Bureau No. 3). He was promoted quickly within the agency, and almost exactly a year later in late April 2018, he was appointed to his current position, Vice Minister of State Security. With higher office, his political stature continued to grow, serving as a representative at the communist party's 18th and 19th National Congress, and serving as a member of the 13th National Committee of the Chinese People's Political Consultative Conference.

Defection rumors 
In June 2021, rumors began to surface first in Chinese social media, and soon in international news media suggesting Dong had defected in mid-February, flying from Hong Kong to the United States with his adult daughter, Dong Yang. The rumors claimed Dong had provided key information about the Wuhan Institute of Virology and China's biological weapons program that changed the stance of the Biden administration concerning the origins of the COVID-19 pandemic. Speaking to closely watched U.S. intelligence community focused newsletter SpyTalk and The Daily Beast, former Chinese foreign ministry official Han Lianchao, who defected to the United States following the 1989 Tiananmen Square massacre, claimed a friend had told him of rumors that Dong had defected and that the defection was mentioned by Chinese officials during the Sino-American summit in Alaska. Citing an unnamed source, he alleged that China’s foreign minister Wang Yi and Communist Party Politburo member Yang Jiechi had demanded Dong’s return. In the report by Spytalk on June 17, former U.S. intelligence officer Nicholas Eftimiades described the rumor as "exactly what it is, a rumor. It happens all the time", but called Han "a straight shooter, not known to exaggerate in any way or form… trusted for his integrity." 

Within 24 hours of SpyTalk's June 17 exposé, Chinese state media reported that Dong has made an appearance at an MSS seminar, urging China’s intelligence officers to "step up their efforts to hunt down foreign agents and insiders who collude with 'anti-China' forces. A South China Morning Post report about Dong's comments mentioned a "22-year-old journalism student, identified only by his surname Tian, [who has] been accused of providing information to an unnamed Western country to smear China." Tian was tried behind closed doors in 2020. However, the original state media report included neither the location of the seminar, nor any audiovisual record of Dong's presence; further heightening suspicions of Dong's true status. 

Following scattered reports and rumors of his whereabouts, on June 22 an unnamed senior official within the Biden administration gave Spytalk what it called a "definitive" denial. Eftimiades told SpyTalk the unattributed denial from a senior U.S. official was "stunning", and "likely coordinated at the highest levels", calling the saga a closed issue: “game, set, match.” Soon after, two U.S. officials speaking on background to Newsweek said the reports about Dong's defection were "not accurate," and were "absolutely untrue." The following day, the Chinese government released a photo purportedly showing Dong among four other officials on a panel at the 16th meeting of the Security Council Secretaries of the Shanghai Cooperation Organization Member States, which was widely reported as conclusively disproving the defection claims. The meeting was noted by the Chinese Embassy in Washington, though some Chinese netizens have questioned the veracity of the footage. No on the record comments have been released on the matter by either government. 

In its assessment of the saga on June 26, China-focused political risk consultancy SinoInsider concluded "it is very possible that the bulk of defector rumors are classic CCP disinformation operations designed to muddy the waters on the topic and ruin the credibility of the international media, Chinese dissidents, and world governments". The firm said it is likely that a defection did occur, but that "the person is more likely to be at the bureau rank or below" "closer to actual operations and [potentially] more familiar with matters that senior officials (including Xi Jinping) may not know." In the case of an actual defection, they advised that the CCP would either stay silent and increase domestic censorship of the topic, or begin publicly smearing the defector as a liar or criminal. The group categorically dismissed theories that the photos released from the Shanhai Cooperation Organization were fake, saying "the CCP would not risk staging a fake public appearance by the defector only for the propaganda to backfire spectacularly later should the defector make an actual public appearance in the country of defection."

See also 

 National Security Commission of the Chinese Communist Party
 Ministry of Public Security (China)
 Chinese intelligence activity abroad

References 

Members of the Chinese People's Political Consultative Conference
Members of the 18th Politburo of the Chinese Communist Party
Members of the 19th Politburo of the Chinese Communist Party
Chinese spies
People from Shijiazhuang
1963 births
Living people